Ayr, Carrick, and Cumnock is a county constituency represented in the House of Commons of the Parliament of the United Kingdom. It was created for the 2005 general election from parts of the old Ayr and Carrick, Cumnock and Doon Valley constituencies. It has been represented since 2019 by Allan Dorans of the Scottish National Party.

Boundaries

2005 onwards

As defined by the Fifth Review of UK Parliament constituencies, the constituency covers the South Ayrshire electoral wards of Ayr Whitletts; Ayr Lochside; Ayr Newton; Ayr Craigie; Ayr Central; Ayr Fort; Ayr Forehill; Ayr Masonhill; Ayr Belmont; Ayr Old Belmont; Ayr Rozelle; Ayr Doonfoot and Seafield; Coylton and Minishant; North Carrick and Maybole West; North Carrick and Maybole East; South Carrick; Girvan Ailsa and Girvan Glendoune plus the East Ayrshire electoral wards of Patna and Dalrymple; Dalmellington; Drongan, Stair and Rankinston; Ochiltree, Skares, Netherthird and Craigens; New Cumnock; Cumnock East and Cumnock West.

The constituency covers approximately three-fifths of the South Ayrshire council area and one-fifth of the East Ayrshire council area, with the remaining portion of the South Ayrshire council area being covered by the Central Ayrshire constituency. The remainder of East Ayrshire is covered as part of Kilmarnock and Loudoun.

Constituency profile

Demographics
The 2011 UK Census revealed that the Ayr, Carrick and Cumnock constituency had an above-average unemployment rate at 5.6% compared to the Scottish average of 4.8%, with a significant proportion of residents living in local authority housing at 20.2% compared to the Scottish average of 13.2%. The constituency also had a high proportion of retired people and Church of Scotland Protestants at the Census relative to elsewhere in Scotland, with 19% of those living in the constituency retired (14.9% across Scotland) and 43.3% of constituents recognising their religion as Church of Scotland (32.4% across Scotland). 90% of residents identified their ethnicity as White British, with 99% recognising their ethnicity as White. On indicators such as health, educational attainment, income and social class however the area is more deprived than the national average.

Constituency
Ayr is a large resort town located to the north-west of the constituency. It consists of a mixture of working class ex-council estate areas and very affluent suburban areas. From the end of the Second World War until the 2010s, the town was marginally contested between the Labour Party and the Conservative Party. The SNP supplanted the Labour Party during the 2010s and their support is strongest in the more industrialised north of the town. The Conservatives perform best in the suburbs in the south of the town, in areas such as Alloway, Doonfoot and Seafield.

To the south-west of the constituency is the rural region of Carrick, running down the Ayrshire coast between Ayr and Galloway which includes many towns and villages such as Maybole, and the resort towns of Turnberry and Girvan. The area was marginally contested between the Labour Party and the Conservative Party until the 2010s, from which point onwards the area has been contested between the Conservatives and the SNP. The Conservative Party tend to perform stronger in rural outlying villages and wealthier suburban areas, with the SNP performing stronger in Maybole.

Further east, the constituency stretches into the south of the East Ayrshire Council area to cover a set of former mining communities around Cumnock and Doon Valley - it's an area which has traditionally returned a much stronger vote for the Labour Party and weaker Conservative vote in comparison to elsewhere in the Ayr, Carrick and Cumnock, This part of the constituency contains many towns and villages such as Patna, Dalmellington, Bellsbank, and Cumnock which are deprived former mining areas which traditionally returned a very strong vote for the Labour party.

Voting patterns

UK Parliament
In 2005, approximately two-thirds of the former Carrick, Cumnock and Doon Valley constituency was attached to half of the former marginal seat of Ayr to form the Ayr, Carrick and Cumnock constituency. Carrick, Cumnock and Doon Valley had been represented in the UK Parliament by the Labour Party since the 1935 general election, whilst Ayr was represented by the Conservative Party from the 1906 general election until Labour gained the seat during their 1997 landslide electoral victory, from which point onwards the constituency was represented by Labour, with the Conservatives coming in a close second place.

The newly formed Ayr, Carrick and Cumnock constituency was won by Labour's Sandra Osborne at the 2005 general election with a majority of 9,997 votes (22.2%) ahead of the Conservatives. This was reduced slightly to 9,911 votes (21.6%) in 2010, before the constituency fell to the SNP at the 2015 SNP landslide, with SNP candidate Corri Wilson overturning incumbent Labour MP Sandra Osborne's 13,356 vote lead over the SNP (29.1%), securing the constituency with a majority of 11,265 votes (21.6%). Bill Grant of the Conservatives gained the seat at the 2017 snap general election with a majority of 2,774 votes (6.0%) over Corri Wilson of the SNP. In the 2019 General Election, Allan Dorans of the SNP gained the seat from the Conservatives with a majority of 2,329 votes (5.0%).

Scottish Parliament
The constituency overlaps the Scottish Parliamentary constituencies of Ayr and Carrick, Cumnock and Doon Valley.

Since the 2021 Scottish Parliament election, Ayr's Member of the Scottish Parliament (MSP)  has been Siobhian Brown of the SNP.  Her predecessor was the Conservative John Scott, who held the Ayr seat for 21 years.

Carrick, Cumnock and Doon Valley has been represented by the SNP since the 2011 Scottish Parliamentary election. The current MSP for Carrick, Cumnock and Doon Valley is Elena Whitham.

Local Council elections
The Conservatives have been the largest party on South Ayrshire Council since 2003, taking control of the Council in 2006. The Ayr West ward has traditionally been the strongest part of the Council for the Conservative party, with Ayr East also returning a considerable Conservative vote. More recently, the party have also gained votes in the more rural area of Carrick to the south of Ayr, with the SNP forming the largest party in the Ayr North ward.

The SNP have formed the largest party on East Ayrshire Council since 2012, however, Labour remain the largest party in Cumnock and Doon Valley, the part of East Ayrshire covered by the Ayr, Carrick and Cumnock parliamentary constituency.

In the 2022 council elections, the SNP placed first in Ayr North and Ayr East. Labour were the largest party in Cumnock and Doon Valley, and the Conservatives formed the largest party in Carrick, Coylton and Ayr West.

Members of Parliament

Election results

Elections in the 2010s

Elections in the 2000s

References

Westminster Parliamentary constituencies in Scotland
Constituencies of the Parliament of the United Kingdom established in 2005
Ayr
Cumnock
Dalmellington